The United Multi-Ethnic Peoples of Amazonas (PUAMA) is a political party in Venezuela. 

Political parties in Venezuela